Eric Bridgeland is a college basketball coach and the former head coach of the Whitman College Blues. Prior to that he was the interim head coach at Pepperdine University. He became the head coach of the Waves after Vance Walberg resigned due to personal reasons on January 17, 2008.  He was previously an assistant coach at the school. 

On April 15, 2020 he was named the head coach of the University of Redlands Bulldogs. 

Bridgeland is a graduate of the University of Manitoba. Prior to going to Pepperdine, he coached at University of Puget Sound, University of California, Santa Cruz, Stephen F. Austin University, and the Colorado School of Mines.

References

External links
 Redlands profile
 Whitman profile
 Walberg resigns as Pepperdine men's basketball coach

Year of birth missing (living people)
Living people
American men's basketball coaches
Cal State Bakersfield Roadrunners men's basketball coaches
Colorado Mines Orediggers men's basketball coaches
Lewis & Clark Pioneers men's basketball coaches
Manitoba Bisons basketball players
Pepperdine Waves men's basketball coaches
Puget Sound Loggers men's basketball coaches
Redlands Bulldogs men's basketball coaches
Stephen F. Austin Lumberjacks basketball coaches
UC Santa Cruz Banana Slugs men's basketball coaches
West Florida Argonauts men's basketball coaches
Whitman Blues men's basketball coaches